Ceylon was the English name applied to the South Asian island nation of Sri Lanka until it repudiated its status as a Dominion and became a republic in 1972.

Ceylon  may also refer to:

Places

Sri Lanka
 Portuguese Ceylon (Ceilão), a Portuguese colony between 1505 and 1658
 Dutch Ceylon (Zeylan), a Dutch East India Company territory between 1640 and 1796
 British Ceylon, a British territory from 1815 to 1948
 Dominion of Ceylon, a dominion in the British Commonwealth between 1948 and 1972
 Jung Ceylon, the same English name was given to Jang Si Lang (modern day Phuket)

Canada
 Ceylon, Saskatchewan, a village
 Ceylon, Ontario, a village

United States 
 Ceylon, Georgia, a ghost town
 Ceylon, Indiana, an unincorporated community
 Ceylon, Minnesota, a city
 Ceylon, Pennsylvania, an unincorporated community

Ships 
 HMS Ceylon (1808), a 32-gun frigate in the Royal Navy
 HMS Ceylon (30), an Fiji-class cruiser commissioned in 1943
 Ceylon-class cruiser, a sub-class of the Fiji-class cruisers

Other uses 
 Ceylon tea, a brand of tea which produced and packed in Sri Lanka
 Ceylon (curry), a family of curry recipes
 Ceylon (film), an Indian film
 Ceylon (programming language), a programming language announced by Red Hat in 2011
 45604 Ceylon, a British LMS Jubilee Class locomotive

People with the given name 
 Ceylon Manohar (c. 1944 – 2018), Tamil pop singer and actor

See also
 Air Ceylon, the Sri Lankan national airline until 1978, then replaced by Air Lanka
 Ceylon ironwood or Mesua ferrea, a plant native to Sri Lanka
 Names of Sri Lanka
 Radio Ceylon, the oldest radio station in south Asia, then replaced by Sri Lanka Broadcasting Corporation in 1967

Names of Sri Lanka